Joseph Charles Benning (born December 7, 1956) is an American politician and a Republican who served as a member of the Vermont Senate representing Caledonia District from 2011 to 2023. He served as the Senate's Minority leader from January 2013 to January 2017, when he was succeeded by Dustin Allard Degree.  In late 2017, Degree resigned from the Senate, and Benning was again chosen by the Senate's Republicans to serve as Minority Leader.

Born in Long Branch, New Jersey, Benning graduated from Mater Dei High School in 1975. He earned a B.A. in Social Science from Lyndon State College in 1979 and a J.D. from the Vermont Law School in 1983.

Benning is former Chair of Vermont's Human Rights Commission and former member of the Board of Trustees for the Vermont State Colleges. He was elected to the Vermont Senate in 2010.

References

External links
Official page at the Vermont Legislature
Campaign site

Joe Benning at Ballotpedia

|-

|-

|-

1956 births
21st-century American politicians
Living people
Lyndon State College alumni
Mater Dei High School (New Jersey) alumni
People from Caledonia County, Vermont
Politicians from Long Branch, New Jersey
Sportspeople from Monmouth County, New Jersey
Vermont Law and Graduate School alumni
Vermont lawyers
Republican Party Vermont state senators